Dimitri Leemans is a Belgian mathematician born in Uccle in 1972.

Biography
Leemans obtained his Licence en Sciences Mathématiques at the Université libre de Bruxelles in 1994 and his doctorate degree, under the supervision of Francis Buekenhout and Michel Dehon in 1998.

He is currently Professor at the mathematics department of the Faculty of Sciences of the Université libre de Bruxelles. He lived five years in New Zealand from 2011 until 2016 where he worked for the University of Auckland as an Associate Professor. He returned to Belgium after experiencing problems with Immigration New Zealand because of his stepson's autism.

Prizes and awards 
 Agathon De Potter prize for the period 2000-2002 from the Academie Royale des Sciences de Belgique
 2007 Annual Prize in Mathematics from the Academie Royale des Sciences de Belgique
 2013-2016 Marsden grant from the Royal Society of New Zealand
 New Zealand Mathematical Society 2014 Research Award
 2018 Francois Deruyts Prize in Geometry from the  Academie Royale des Sciences de Belgique

Research 
Leemans's principal area of research is at the interface of algebra, computational mathematics, combinatorics and geometry. He has made major contributions in the study of regular and chiral polytopes whose automorphism groups are finite almost simple groups. He has published more than 90 papers in peer-reviewed scientific journals  and two memoirs of the Academie Royale des Sciences de Belgique. He is the developer of the Magma (computer algebra system) package on incidence geometry and coset geometry since 1999.

Major scientific publications

References

External links 
 Personal website of Dimitri Leemans

Belgian mathematicians
Université libre de Bruxelles alumni
Academic staff of the University of Auckland
People from Uccle
1972 births
Living people
Academic staff of the Université libre de Bruxelles
Belgian expatriates in New Zealand